Lipatephia is a monotypic moth genus of the family Erebidae erected by George Hampson in 1926. Its only species, Lipatephia illegitima, was first described by Wallengren in 1875. It is found in South Africa.

Lepidoptera and Some Other Life Forms and Afromoths give this name as a synonym of Aedia Hübner, [1823] and the species as Aedia illegitima (Wallengren, 1875).

References

Endemic moths of South Africa
Calpinae
Monotypic moth genera